L/R: Licensed by Royalty is a Japanese anime television series written by Kazuki Matsui, directed by Itsuro Kawasaki, and animated by TNK.

The show is set in an alternate world where the United Kingdom and Ireland do not exist with Ishtar and Ivory taking their places with the rest of the world. It centers on Cloud 7, an intelligence organization whose mandate is to protect the Ishtarian Royal Family and their property from criminals/terrorists/assassins. The two main characters of the show are Jack Hofner and Rowe Rickenbacker, who are known in the intelligence world and by criminals, terrorists and assassins as L/R. The series focuses mainly on the protection of Noelle Ardelade, a 14-year-old girl from Ivory as she has links to the Ishtarian monarchy.

The title name is changed from the original Japanese title, L/R: Licensed by Royal, for North America and Europe.

Plot
Jack Hofner and Rowe Rickenbacker, Cloud 7's top agents, are mandated to protect the Ishtarian royal family and their reputation while also protecting their property from crime and terrorism. While a few of their cases involved the protection of royal artifacts and royal family affiliates, Jack and Rowe were tasked by Commander Camille Freed to secure Noelle Ardelade, a girl of Ivory Island and candidate for the "15-year princess". As time passes, the two agents become involved in solving cases of corruption, bombings and murder that could rock the Ishtar nation. Jack and Rowe, working under Mister's orders, are placed in a black operation to expose top officials of DTI and Duke Regent Rand for their involvement in the assassination of Prince Sparda who found that there were illegal dealings in securing Ivorystone from Ivory Island. The two agents fake the assassination of Noelle in front of a live audience, which is also televised worldwide, in order to arrest the Duke and DTI Chairman Taylor for the prince's death.

The series ends with Noelle continuing her life as a civilian after her supposed death. While returning on an errand, Rowe is stabbed in the back by Frost, son of the former director of the now disgraced DTI. The ending is open to interpretation as to whether Rowe survived the stabbing.

Characters
Cloud 7 is an intelligence agency mandated by the Ishtaran Royal Family to protect them and their property, under the control of the Royal Houseguard. Because of this, they are freely able to operate locally and abroad if the cases they are working on concerns the royal family. The agency is run by Holden Pennylane, known as Mister. Among the personnel of Cloud 7 are Jack Hofner, Rowe Rickenbaker, Claire Pennylane and Desmond (Dez) McCarthy . Their headquarters is located in downtown Ishtar.

 
 
 Jack Hofner is one of the agents working for Cloud 7 and one of the members of the L/R duo. He is a blonde-haired man, cool, relaxed and sophisticated, enjoys smoking and wears a white suit with a yellow and blue dress shirt. He works closely with his partner Rowe Rickenbacker, and previously worked with Claudia Eastman.
 His symbol on the Cloud 7 gameboard is a Roadster token for when he is summoned to headquarters.

 
 
 Rowe Rickenbacker is also a secret agent working for Cloud 7 and the partner of Jack Hoffman. He is more outspoken Jack and has brown hair tied in a ponytail and wears a red shirt and a black trench coat. Like Jack, he smokes when he is not on an operation. Rowe is a master of disguise is most likely to work undercover wearing one of his many disguises. At the end of the series, Rowe was stabbed in the back by a disgraced Frost after the ex-DTI Information Director secretly followed him. It is unknown whether Rowe survived the attack.
 His symbol on the Cloud 7 gameboard is a boot, which was never used in the series.

  
 
 Mister is the head of Cloud 7 and a retired secret agent who was appointed by Camille Freed to run the agency. He was a close friend of the former Prince Sparda and his family His full name is Holden Pennylane and has a daughter named Claire Pennylane, who also works with Cloud 7. 
 His symbol on the Cloud 7 gameboard is a Top hat token.

 
 
 Claire Pennylane is the daughter of Mister Holden Pennylane and is a member of Cloud 7. Generally she works in headquarters, running dispatches to call for Jack and Rowe whenever there is a debriefing. She sometimes goes into the field on missions and assists if Jack or Rowe need additional help. She is romantically attracted to Rowe Rickenbacker.

 
 
 Dez is the developer of special weapons for Cloud 7 and provides L/R with technical support.

 
 
 Camille Freed serves as captain of the Isharu Royal Chamber of Commerce and commander of Royal Houseguards. She is the daughter of Prince Sparda Freed and although she can be quite stern and authoritarian, she has a kind heart.

Media

Music
The opening sequence of the L/R, "Go where no ones gone before" by Billy Preston, was released on a CD single on February 3, 2003 under the JVC Victor label. The ending sequence of L/R, "Negai no Toki" by Mikako Takahashi, was released on January 22, 2003 under the same label.

Two OSTs were released on the show, consisting of VOCAL SIDE and INST SIDE. VOCAL SIDE was released on February 21, 2003 with 13 tracks under JVC Victor. INST SIDE was released on the same date with 18 tracks under the same label.

Drama CD
Two Drama CDs were released consisting of L SIDE and the R SIDE. The L SIDE was released on March 21, 2003 under JVC Victor. The R SIDE was released on the same day. The premise centers on some missions from Jack and Rowe's perspectives. Both of these CDs have the TV version of "Go where no ones gone before" while the VOCAL SIDE has the full version.

Anime
L/R: Licensed by Royal had originally aired on Fuji Television from January 8, 2003 to March 26, 2003 without the fourth episode, making it a 12-episode run. Another run was placed on AT-X from July 17, 2006 to October 9, 2006 with the full run of 13 episodes including the DVD-only episode "Sweet enemies in the same desert". Production of the series was done under TNK.

Reception

Zac Bertschy of Anime News Network commented that it was an "undercooked" show, but had a good dub while it had trouble with episode structure and plot progression. He also said that the opening theme song by Billy Preston was catchy because it's "probably one of the best anime theme songs from the past five years, mostly because it doesn't sound like an anime theme song".  Adam Arseneau felt the series was "too dull to be intriguing or compelling, but too comfortable and easygoing to be a total failure".  The reviewer for AnimePRO compared the "fluid and loose" exaggerated actions and fight scenes to Lupin III, and enjoyed the rapport between Jack and Rowe. They felt that the second volume had the right blend of action, an engaging story, and the right amount of humour.

Andrew MacLennan enjoyed the use of a British cast for the English dub, feeling it added to the espionage atmosphere, but felt that the story was not sufficiently engaging for an adult audience, despite the M rating. Tiffani Nadeau praised VOCAL SIDE's arrangement, saying that the CD flowed well from one track to the next, and Patrick King praised the variety in the songs, feeling the CD held up well even without the context of the series.

References

Further reading
 Newtype USA, December 2002

External links
 Geneon's official L/R site 
 Official Fuji TV site 
 
 

2003 anime television series debuts
Anime with original screenplays
Fuji TV original programming
Geneon USA
NBCUniversal Entertainment Japan
TNK (company)